Corinna is a town in Penobscot County, Maine, United States. The population was 2,221 at the 2020 census. It is part of the Bangor metropolitan statistical area. The village of Corinna is in the southern part of the town.

History

It was first called T4 R4 NWP (or Township 4, Range 4, North of the Waldo Patent). On June 30, 1804, Dr. John Warren of Boston bought  on speculation from Massachusetts for two cents an acre, or $460.80. To encourage settlement, he gave away some land and built a combination gristmill and sawmill. The town would be incorporated on December 11, 1816, as Corinna, named after Dr. Warren's daughter.

The first homes were built of hewn logs. Corinna developed into a farming community, with water powered mills at the outlet of Corundel Lake. After the arrival of the Dexter and Newport Railroad in 1865–1866, the village developed into a small mill town. Industries would include sawmills, planing mills, woolen textile mills, and a door, sash and blind factory. There were also boot and shoemaking shops and an iron foundry. The Eastland Woolen Mill manufactured woolen materials from the 1930s until it closed in 1997, after which it was demolished. The town is now largely a bedroom community of Bangor.

Historic building

The Stewart Free Library (1898), a gift to the town by Corinna-born Minneapolis millionaire Levi M. Stewart, was designed by Minneapolis architect William Harrison Grimshaw. The library is listed on the National Register of Historic Places, and contains well-preserved historic interiors as well as a majestic facade with clocktower. It resembles a mid-western county courthouse more than a typical small-town Maine library. The Corinna Union Academy educated students in the town from 1851 to 1968.

A memorial dedicated to the soldiers that have died in the War on Terror is located near the river. It is made out of marble and incised with the names of fallen soldiers.

Geography

Situated beside Corundel Lake, Corinna is drained by the East Branch Sebasticook River and Alder Stream, both part of the Kennebec River watershed.

Corinna is also located on the Newport/Dover-Foxcroft Rail Trail, which was developed along a former Maine Central Railroad line after tracks and ties were removed in 1993.

Climate

This climatic region is typified by large seasonal temperature differences, with warm to hot (and often humid) summers and cold (sometimes severely cold) winters.  According to the Köppen Climate Classification system, Corinna has a humid continental climate, abbreviated "Dfb" on climate maps.

Demographics

2010 census

As of the census of 2010, there were 2,198 people, 926 households, and 622 families living in the town. The racial makeup of the town was 97.2% White, 0.3% African American, 0.3% Native American, 0.2% Asian, 0.1% from other races, and 1.9% from two or more races. Hispanic or Latino of any race were 0.6% of the population.

There were 926 households, of which 28.8% had children under the age of 18 living with them, 50.8% were married couples living together, 9.7% had a female householder with no husband present, 6.7% had a male householder with no wife present, and 32.8% were non-families. 25.3% of all households were made up of individuals, and 11.4% had someone living alone who was 65 years of age or older. The average household size was 2.37 and the average family size was 2.81.

The median age in the town was 43 years. 22.5% of residents were under the age of 18; 7% were between the ages of 18 and 24; 22.9% were from 25 to 44; 30.7% were from 45 to 64; and 16.9% were 65 years of age or older. The gender makeup of the town was 48.6% male and 51.4% female.

2000 census

As of the census of 2000, there were 2,145 people, 842 households, and 621 families living in the town. There were 981 housing units at an average density of 25.4 per square mile (9.8/km2). The racial makeup of the town was 98.18% White, 0.42% African American, 0.14% Native American, 0.09% Asian, 0.23% from other races, and 0.93% from two or more races. Hispanic or Latino of any race were 0.51% of the population.

There were 842 households, out of which 31.0% had children under the age of 18 living with them, 60.0% were married couples living together, 8.2% had a female householder with no husband present, and 26.2% were non-families. 21.0% of all households were made up of individuals, and 10.7% had someone living alone who was 65 years of age or older.  The average household size was 2.55 and the average family size was 2.89.

In the town, the population was spread out, with 24.9% under the age of 18, 7.4% from 18 to 24, 28.0% from 25 to 44, 24.4% from 45 to 64, and 15.4% who were 65 years of age or older.  The median age was 39 years. For every 100 females, there were 99.5 males.  For every 100 females age 18 and over, there were 99.6 males.

The median income for a household in the town was $32,115, and the median income for a family was $37,900. Males had a median income of $28,707 versus $17,500 for females. The per capita income for the town was $17,345.  About 14.1% of families and 19.5% of the population were below the poverty line, including 26.4% of those under age 18 and 8.5% of those age 65 or over.

Site of interest

 Corinna Historical Society Museum

Education

Corinna is part of Regional School Unit #19. Mike Hammer is the Superintendent of Schools.

Notable people 

 Grenville C. Emery, founder of Harvard-Westlake School
 Sam Fifield, Wisconsin politician
 Gilbert Patten, author

References

External links
 Town of Corinna official website
 Stewart Free Library
 Natural Resources Council of Maine page on Newport/Dover-Foxcroft Rail Trail

Towns in Penobscot County, Maine
Towns in Maine